Problognathia is a monotypic genus of worms belonging to the monotypic family Problognathiidae. The only species is Problognathia minima.

The species is found in Bermuda.

References

Gnathostomulida
Platyzoa genera
Monotypic animal genera